The 2021 AfroBasket Women was the 25th edition of the tournament and held from 18 to 26 September 2021 in Yaoundé, Cameroon. The top two teams qualified for one of the qualifying tournaments for the 2022 FIBA Women's Basketball World Cup.

Nigeria defended their title and won their fifth overall title after a finals win over Mali. Cameroon secured bronze on home soil by defeating Senegal.

Qualification

Draw
The draw was held on 31 July 2021.

Squads

Preliminary round
All times are local (UTC±0).

Group A

Group B

Group C

Group D

Knockout stage

Bracket

Fifth place bracket

Qualification to quarterfinals

Quarterfinals

5–8th place semifinals

Semifinals

Seventh place game

Fifth place game

Third place game

Final

Final standings

Statistics and awards

Statistical leaders

Players

Points

Rebounds

Assists

Blocks

Steals

Efficiency

Teams

Points

Rebounds

Assists

Blocks

Steals

Efficiency

Awards
The awards were announced on 26 September 2021.

References

External links
Official website
Tournament summary

 
2021
2021 in African basketball
Women's Afrobasket
2021 in women's basketball